The Fake is a 1927 British silent drama film directed by Georg Jacoby and starring Henry Edwards, Elga Brink and Juliette Compton. It is based on a 1924 play of the same title by Frederick Lonsdale. It was made at Twickenham Studios in London.

Plot
An M.P. pressures his daughter to marry an aristocrat in spite of his drug addiction.

Cast
Henry Edwards as Geoffrey Sands 
Elga Brink as Mavis Stanton 
Juliette Compton as Mrs. Hesketh Pointer 
Norman McKinnel as Ernest Stanton 
Miles Mander as Honourable Gerald Pillick 
J. Fisher White as Sir Thomas Moorgate 
A. Bromley Davenport as Hesketh Pointer 
Julie Suedo as Dancer 
Ivan Samson as Clifford Howe 
Ursula Jeans as Maid

References

External links

British drama films
1927 drama films
Films directed by Georg Jacoby
British films based on plays
Films set in London
Films set in England
Films shot at Twickenham Film Studios
British silent feature films
British black-and-white films
1920s British films
Silent drama films
1920s English-language films